
The Uganda Independence Medal was authorised by Queen Elizabeth II on the occasion of the granting of independence to Uganda to give recognition to individuals of the Armed Forces, Police Force and Local Government. Members of the military and police serving on 9 October 1962 and civil servants, local government employees and other residents of Uganda who have rendered outstanding public service.

Description
 The circular cupro-nickel Uganda Independence Medal features the crowned effigy of Queen Elizabeth II. 
 The reverse of the medal depicts the Uganda Coat of Arms and the inscription Uganda Independence, 9th October 1962.
 The ribbon has a six equal vertical stripes, black, yellow, red, black, yellow red.

References

Independence Medal
Awards established in 1962
1962 establishments in Uganda